Surfing Florida is an exhibition created in cooperation between the University of Central Florida and Florida Atlantic University chronicling the history of surfing and surf culture in Florida. The exhibition combines photographic works and displays, as well as vintage surf materials, in order to detail Florida's influence on American surfing and vice versa.

History
Surfing Florida was developed at Florida Atlantic University in Boca Raton, Florida, the brainchild of W. Ron Faulds, in 2008. Beginning as a photographic exhibit, the project was allowed to grow through a grant from the Florida Humanities Council in order to study the larger themes in Florida surf culture. It is currently part of the Regional Initiative for Collecting the History, Experiences and Stories of Central Florida (RICHES) program at the University of Central Florida.

SOUTH FLORIDA SURF SHOPS: 1960-1965

SURFBOARD HOUSE, South Beach, Florida (Cut and Shape boards: Jack "Murf The Surf" Murphy) (Surfboard House Surfboards)
WEST COAST EAST, South Beach, Florida (Owner the "GIMP")
The Surf Shop, Sunny Isles, Florida (Owner Johnny Dalgren)(Rick Surfboards)
Bucks Surf Shop, Delray Beach, Florida
James and O'Hare Cocoa Beach, Florida (Owner Rick James and Pat O'Hare) (James & O'Hare Surfboards)

Goals
As Surfing Florida expands its scope, the project intends to draw attention to major issues and greater themes within the surf community, including beach erosion and beach access. Ultimately, Surfing Florida intends to grow into a larger maritime history of Florida.

Featured Surfers
 Kelly Slater: Cocoa Beach, Florida, Winner, 1992, 1994–1996, 1999, 2008 Pipeline Masters.
 Jeff Crawford: Melbourne Beach, Florida, Winner, 1974 Pipeline Masters.
 Gary Propper: Cocoa Beach, Florida, Winner, 1966 East Coast Championships. 1996 East Coast Hall of Fame Inductee.
 Lisa Andersen: Ormond Beach, Florida.
 Cory Lopez: Dunedin, Florida, 2001 Teahupo'o ASP World Tour Event Champion.
 Frieda Zamba: Flagler Beach, Florida, 1984-1986 Women's World Surfing Champion.
 Cliff Waltch, Sunny Isles Pier, Florida (WARDY Surfboard Competition Team)
 Pete Athas, Sunny Isles Pier, Florida (1963-1965 East Coast RICK Surfboard Competition Team)
 Stu Duffy,  Sunny Isles Pier, Florida (1963-1965 East Coast RICK Surfboard Competition Team)
 Charlie Cogal (sp) Sunny Isles Pier, Florida (1963-1965 East Coast RICK Surfboard Competition Team)
 Tom Septembre Sunny Isles Pier, Florida (1964-1965 East Coast RICK Surfboard Competition Team)
 Jack "Murf The Surf" Murphy, South Beach, Florida (cut and shape boards for Surfboard House, early 60's?). Opened a surf shop in Indiatlantic, Florida

Beaches of Interest
 Daytona Beach, Florida
 Cocoa Beach, Florida - known as "Surf City"
 Flagler Beach, Florida
 Sebastian Inlet, Florida
 Satellite Beach, Florida
 Ponce Inlet, Florida
 New Smyrna Beach, Florida
 SOUTH BEACH PIER, Florida
 Sunny Isles Pier, Florida
 Delray Beach Pier, Florida
 Haulover Beach Pier, Florida
 Juno Beach Cliffs, Florida
 Fort Pierce Jetty, Florida

References

External links
 
 Surfing Florida blog
 Surfing Florida on Facebook

Surfing in the United States
Surfing in Florida
2008 establishments in Florida